Tercera División de Paraguay (Third Division of Paraguay, in English), is the third division of Paraguayan football (soccer), and it is organized by the Paraguayan Football Association in the metropolitan area, and organized by the Unión del Fútbol del Interior, in the rest of the country, except Asunción and Central department.

The Paraguayan Third Division is divided into three leagues:

 The Primera División B (disputed within Asunción and the Central Department).
 The Primera División B Nacional (disputed by clubs in Paraguay's interior).
 The Campeonato Nacional de Interligas (disputed by representative teams of each of the 17 departments of Paraguay with the exception of Asunción and the Central Department).

Primera División B Nacional
The Primera División B Nacional tournament is being played since 2011. Teams from the all departaments of Paraguay (except Asunción and Central department) take part in this third division league. Since 2014, in even years the champion does not earn direct promotion, but gets the chance to play a repechage against the runner-up of the Primera División B, in odd years the champion is directly promoted and the runner-up is the one who wins the right to play the repechage.

List of champions

Campeonato Nacional de Interligas
 Campeonato Nacional de Interligas

See also
 Football in Paraguay
 Paraguayan football league system
 Primera División Paraguaya
 División Intermedia
 Paraguayan Cuarta División
 Unión del Fútbol del Interior
 Paraguayan women's football championship
 Football Federation of the 1st Department Concepción
 Football Federation of the 2nd Department San Pedro
 Football Federation of the 3rd Department Cordillera
 Football Federation of the 4th Department Guairá
 Football Federation of the 5th Department Caaguazú
 Football Federation of the 6th Department Caazapá
 Football Federation of the 7th Department Itapúa
 Football Federation of the 8th Department Misiones
 Football Federation of the 9th Department Paraguarí
 Football Federation of the 10th Department Alto Paraná
 Football Federation of the 11th Department Central
 Football Federation of the 12th Department Ñeembucú
 Football Federation of the 13th Department Amambay
 Football Federation of the 14th Department Canindeyú
 Football Federation of the 15th Department Presidente Hayes
 Football Federation of the 16th Department Alto Paraguay
 Football Federation of the 17th Department Boquerón

External links
List of Champions by Juan P. Andrés and Eli Schmerler at RSSSF
Paraguayan Football Association Official website

References

3
Para